Molla Mahmud may refer to:

 Molla Mahmud, Bushehr
 Molla Mahmud, East Azerbaijan
 Molla Mahmud, Razavi Khorasan